Valdez Airport , also known as Pioneer Field, is a state-owned public-use airport located three nautical miles (6 km) east of the central business district of Valdez, a city in the Valdez-Cordova Census Area of the U.S. state of Alaska.

Facilities and aircraft 
It has one asphalt paved runway designated 6/24 which measures 6,500 by 150 feet (1,981 x 46 m).

For the 12-month period ending December 31, 2018, the airport had 9,300 aircraft operations, an average of 25 per day: 41% air taxi, 54% general aviation and 5% military. At that time there were 35 aircraft based at this airport: 25 single-engine, 1 multi-engine, 7 helicopter and 2 ultralight.

Airlines and destinations 

Historically, the airport had scheduled passenger jet service provided by Alaska Airlines during the mid-1970s.  The Alaska Airlines system timetable dated February 1, 1975 lists a Boeing 727-100 flight nonstop to Anchorage.  Era Aviation served the airport during the 1980s with Convair 580 and de Havilland Canada DHC-7 Dash 7 turboprops.

References

External links
 FAA Alaska airport diagram (GIF)
 

Airports in Chugach Census Area, Alaska